A postman is a mail carrier, a person delivering post.

Postman, The Postman, or Postmen may refer to:

People
Leo Postman (1918–2004), American psychologist
Neil Postman (1931–2003), American author, media theorist and cultural critic
Marc Postman American astronomer
Mick Price (snooker player) (born 1966), English snooker player nicknamed "The Postman"

Art, entertainment, and media

Other arts and media
Postman (comics), a Marvel Comics character
Postman (The Legend of Zelda series), a recurring character in the Legend of Zelda video game series
 A hypothetical or fictional adult male posthuman
The Postman (1985), a post-apocalyptic novel by David Brin
 Postman, a fictional character in the British web series Corner Shop Show

Films
Postman (1967 film), Indian Malayalam film
Postman (1984 film), a Turkish comedy film
Il Postino, the 1994 Italian film known as The Postman in English
Postman (1995 film), a Chinese film
The Postman (film), a 1997 film adaptation of David Brin's novel starring Kevin Costner

Music
Postmen (band), a Dutch reggae/hip hop band
Postman, stage name of Remon Stotijn, former member of Postmen
Postman (album), a 2009 album by Postmen
"The Postman", by The American Analog Set from their album Know by Heart (2001)
"Postman", song by Living Colour from their album Stain (1993)
"Postman", song by The Rasmus from their album Peep (1996)

Other uses
Postman (software), an API platform for developers to design, build, test and iterate their APIs
The postman or common postman Heliconius melpomene, a species of butterfly
Postman (law), a senior barrister of the historic Exchequer of pleas of England and Wales